Vincent John Wells (born 6 August 1965) is an English former professional cricketer. He played nine One Day Internationals for the England cricket team in 1999 and was a member of the squad for the 1999 Cricket World Cup.

References

External links
 

1965 births
Living people
Cricketers at the 1999 Cricket World Cup
English cricketers
England One Day International cricketers
Durham cricketers
Kent cricketers
Leicestershire cricketers
Leicestershire cricket captains
Sportspeople from Dartford